German International School Sharjah (DSS) is a German international school in Sharjah in the UAE, serving kindergarten through grade 11. It was established in 1976.

References

External links
  German International School Sharjah
 English Information

International schools in Sharjah (city)
German international schools in the United Arab Emirates
Educational institutions established in 1976
1976 establishments in the United Arab Emirates